Beckwithshaw is a village and civil parish in the Harrogate district of North Yorkshire, England about  south-west of Harrogate.

History 
Beckwithshaw takes its name from the now smaller settlement of Beckwith,  to the east. The suffix "shaw", first recorded in 1323, is from the Old English sceaga, meaning a copse.

In 1875, a reservoir was built to the west of the village. Known as Ten Acre Reservoir, it actually only covered . In 2016, a report was commissioned into its future as the dam head was known to be failing. In 2019, it will be drained so that it only contains  of water to relieve pressure on the dam head and will also be converted into a wildlife area.

Beckwithshaw was historically a hamlet in the ancient parish of Pannal.  When the village of Pannal was removed from the civil parish of Pannal in 1937, Beckwithshaw became the largest settlement in the parish. The name of the civil parish was changed from Pannal to Beckwithshaw in 2010.  The parish now shares a grouped parish council with Haverah Park.

Amenities
The village has a primary school, a pub (The Smiths Arms) and the Anglican Church of St Michael and All Angels. A board in the church names all the vicars, the first being Charles Farrar Forster, who served from 1887 until his death in August 1894. The church benefice is shared with St Robert's Church, Pannal. A post office was opened in the village in 1887 but closed in October 1978.

Sports
Beckwithshaw Horse Trials, organised by British Eventing, is an annual cross country event held at Beaver Horse Shop on Windmill Farm.

References

External links

Beckwithshaw Community Primary School
Church of St Michael and All Angels
The Smiths Arms
Beckwithshaw Horse Trials
Beaver Horse Shop

Villages in North Yorkshire
Civil parishes in North Yorkshire